Marie, Queen of Rodrigues (Marie, Reine de Rodrigues) is a six-foot tall statue of the Virgin Mary erected on the heights of Pointe Canon. The statue is a noted landmark of Port Mathurin and is a gathering place for Catholics on the island as well as a tourist and historical site.

The cement statue was inaugurated on May 1, 1954.

The idea for such a statue on the island was that of Father Charles Streicher, who was the priest of Rodrigues in the late 1940s. He wanted to raise in miniature a monument like that of Mary, Queen of Peace, which he had had erected in Mauritius. It was his successor, Father Gandy, who oversaw the installation of Rodrigues' statue.

Statues of the Virgin Mary
Buildings and structures in Rodrigues
Religion in Mauritius
Arts in Mauritius
1954 establishments in Mauritius
Tourism in Mauritius